Suman Aryal (born 31 January 2000) is a Nepali footballer who plays as a defender for Nepali club Tribhuvan Army and the Nepal national team.

References

External links
 

Living people
2000 births
Nepalese footballers
Nepal international footballers
Association football defenders
People from Nawalpur District